The Riikka Nieminen Award is an ice hockey trophy, seasonally awarded by the Finnish Ice Hockey Association to the Naisten Liiga Player of the Year. It is named after Riikka Sallinen (née Nieminen), now retired, who is widely considered the best European women’s ice hockey player to ever compete internationally.

The trophy was first awarded for the 2008–09 season and Michelle Karvinen of the Espoo Blues was the first recipient. Jenni Hiirikoski is the only defenceman to ever win the trophy and holds the record for most wins, with five. Elisa Holopainen is the only other player to have claimed the trophy more than once, winning it in the 2018–19 season and 2020–21 season. Anni Keisala is the current title holder after winning the Riikka Nieminen Award for the 2021–22 season, becoming the first goaltender to do so.

Award winners 

Source: Elite Prospects

All time award recipients

References

Ice hockey player of the year awards
Naisten Liiga (ice hockey) trophies and awards